Parkside is a suburb of Mount Isa in the City of Mount Isa, Queensland, Australia.

Geography 
The Leichhardt River flows north-south through the town of Mount Isa, dividing the suburbs of the town into "mineside" (west of the Leichhardt River) and "townside" (east of the Leichhardt River). Parkside is a "mineside" suburb.

History 
St Joseph's Catholic Primary School was established by the Sisters of St Joseph in Railway Avenue in 1923 and operated there until 1984. In 1964, the Sisters established a secondary school for girls called San Jose Catholic Secondary School (also known as San Jose College) on Twenty-Third Avenue. Both schools closed as part of a rationalisation and amalgamation of Catholic schools in Mount Isa.  On 29 January 1985, St Joseph's Catholic Primary School relocated to the San Jose site in Twenty-Third Avenue, while the San Jose College amalgamated with St Kieran's Christian Brothers College in Menzies to form the co-educational Mount Isa Catholic High School (later renamed Good Shepherd Catholic College) at the former St Kieran's site at Menzies.

Mount Isa State High School opened on 2 February 1953. It closed on 31 December 2002. In 2003 it amalgamated with  Kalkadoon State High School to create Spinifex State College with two campuses, a junior campus (7-9) at the former Mount Isa State High School site and a senior campus (10-12) at the former Kalkadoon State High School (in Pioneer). Mount Isa State High School's website has been archived.

In the 2011 census, Parkside had a population of 1,784 people.

Heritage listings 
Parkside has a number of heritage-listed sites, including:
 Camooweal Street: Tent House
 6-12 Fifth Avenue: Spinifex State College Junior Campus

Education 
Spinifex State College is a government secondary (7-12) school for boys and girls  In 2017, the school had an enrolment of 817 students with 77 teachers and 71 non-teaching staff (58 full-time equivalent). The junior campus (Years 7-9) is at 6-16 Fifth Avenue. It includes a special education program.

St Joseph's Catholic School is a Catholic primary (Prep-6) school for boys and girls at 50 - 60 Twenty-Third Avenue. In 2017, the school had an enrolment of 313 students with 22 teachers (20 full-time equivalent) and 18 non-teaching staff (12 full-time equivalent).

There is no government primary school in the suburb. The nearest government primary school is Happy Valley State School in neighbouring Happy Valley to the south.

Amenities 
There are a number of parks in the area:

 Captain James Cook Park
 Magpie Street Park

References

External links